Terra Branford, known as  in Japanese, is a fictional character in the Final Fantasy series and the main protagonist of Final Fantasy VI.  Yoshitaka Amano and Tetsuya Nomura designed her for the main series installment, with Kazuko Shibuya designing her in-game sprites alongside the rest of the characters. She also appears in the spin-off fighting game series Dissidia Final Fantasy and the rhythm series Theatrhythm Final Fantasy. She has made small appearances in several other games in and outside the Final Fantasy series.

Terra is an 18-year-old young woman who is the daughter of a human mother and a father who is an Esper, a magical creature with the natural ability to use powerful magic. She was mentally enslaved by the evil Gestahlian Empire, who used her gifted powers to wage war on the empire's neighboring countries. Several rebels rescue her at the beginning of Final Fantasy VI, and she decides to aid their campaign and protect those whose lives were affected by the Empire.

Developers, who initially planned Branford to be a young man, designed her character to start as a passive person in the first half of the game to show her growth throughout the story. Terra's character has received widespread critical acclaim, with game journalists and fans alike praising her complexity and unique backstory. She has been on many lists of gamers' favorite Final Fantasy characters and is one of the most well-known video game characters to date.

Appearances

Final Fantasy VI 
Terra is introduced at the beginning of the game as a mind-controlled pawn of the Gestahlian Empire, who seek to use her destructive magical abilities for the Emperor's own ends. Chasing rumors of a powerful mythical being known as an Esper being unearthed at the mining town of Narshe, Terra and a pair of Imperial soldiers assault the town using a trio of armored walkers. After facing the Narshe militia and battling their way to the Esper, a mysterious reaction between Terra and the creature blasts the two soldiers away, killing them, while the Empire's hold over her is broken and she is left unconscious and with her memory wiped. Terra is rescued by an anti-Imperial sympathizer named Arvis, who entrusts his friend, a wandering thief named Locke Cole, to escort her out of the city as the Narshe guards threaten to capture her for working with the Empire.

An otherwise directionless Terra accompanies Locke across the continent, eventually meeting with an underground resistance movement called the Returners just as they learn that Emperor Gestahl's second in command, a mad jester named Kefka, is moving to attack Narshe again. Terra and her allies arrive just in time to defend the Esper, repelling the attack, but upon approaching the creature once again its magic causes Terra to transform into a luminescent, ethereal figure (later revealed to be her own Esper form) before flying off. Pursuing her, Locke and his party find her being healed by an Esper named Ramuh, restoring her memory and revealing Terra to be the hybrid daughter of an Esper warrior named Maduin, and a young human woman named Madeline who found the Espers' hidden world through a secret gate near the Imperial capital of Vector. From this point onward, the player can use Terra's "Trance" ability in battle to temporarily transform Terra, boosting her damage and magical defense.

Although her connection to the Espers may be enough to tip the scales against the Empire, the memories of the destruction she wrought under the Empire's control leave Terra fearful of being used as a weapon again, however she eventually agrees with the Returners' plan to attempt to ally with the Espers against the Empire. After convincing a roguish gambler named Setzer to join their cause Terra and her friends take his airship to the gate near Vector, allowing her to open it using her Esper heritage, however the Espers released ignore the party and instead begin mindlessly attacking the Empire in retribution. This forces Emperor Gestahl to agree to peace with the Returners, with Terra's party allying with an Imperial general named Leo to attempt to bridge the gap between the Espers and humans to stop their rampage. Terra reveals she thinks she may be unable to feel love after her upbringing, but Leo assuages her, saying she will find it eventually. Gestahl and Kefka instead reveal the alliance to be a ruse, killing Leo and many of the Espers before attacking the Esper world to recover the Warring Triad, an ancient divine artifact responsible for the Espers' magic. Gestahl wishes to use it to take over the world, however he is betrayed by Kefka, who kills him before pushing the Triad out of alignment, destroying the world and giving him godlike powers.

In the game's post-apocalyptic second half, Terra is one of several characters optionally encountered by fellow Returner and magic user Celes Chere, who is attempting to reunite the other party members in an attempt to save the world from Kefka, who now resides atop a tower of rubble and dirt as a nihilistic mad god. Instead, Celes finds Terra without the strength or will to fight after she has become the surrogate mother figure for the children of the town of Mobliz after it had been razed by Kefka for opposing him, with the two oldest survivors being a teenage couple named Duane and Katarin. The town is attacked by a demon known as Humbaba, with Terra finding herself to be too weak to stop it and requiring Celes's party to intervene and defeat it. After locating Setzer and unlocking airship travel again, the player returns to Mobliz just as it is attacked by Humbaba again, who is much stronger this time and cannot be defeated until Terra decides to join the party. Her drive to protect the children unlocks her Trance ability again, slaying Humbaba, but she is unable to revert to her human form until she sees the children gather around her, leading to her realizing that has finally found love despite the state of the world. She resolves to join the party in an attack on Kefka's tower as Katarin, now pregnant, urges Terra to "make sure these kids have a world to grow up in!" while Duane promises they will take care of the children until Terra's return.

Terra and her allies move to attack Kefka's tower from the air, battling their way to the pinnacle of the tower where they discover the Warring Triad drained of its magic, meaning Kefka has completely absorbed its power and become the source of all magic in the universe. As Kefka appears in person, he ridicules the party and the other people of the world for trying to hold on to hope when everything they love and cherish can be destroyed by him at a moment's notice, to which Terra and her allies respond by explaining that it is the mundanities of peoples' lives and their love for each other that make their lives worth living. They defeat Kefka just as he prepares to destroy all of creation to prove his point, however with him gone magic begins to disappear from the world. The tower begins to collapse and Terra transforms to lead the party out just as Maduin's spirit talks to her for the last time before fading away, explaining that her Esper side is doomed to disappear as well, but she may remain as a human if she loves the people of the world enough. Terra's Esper powers begin to fade as she is leading the airship away and she falls from the sky before transforming back to a human and being caught by the airship at the last moment, having been saved by her connection to her friends and the children of Mobliz. With Terra at the bow, Setzer flies the airship across the world as life begins to return to the land, passing over Mobliz just as Katarin gives birth to her and Duane's child.

Shibuya and Amano originally designed Terra as having blonde hair, a staple of the Final Fantasy series due to the color's exotic connotations in Japanese culture, however Shibuya instead chose to change her hair to a bright green when finalizing the game's sprites in order to better distinguish Terra from the rest of the cast.

Other appearances 
Terra is the heroine representing Final Fantasy VI in Dissidia: Final Fantasy, a crossover fighting game featuring different characters from the Final Fantasy series. She returns in Dissidia 012 as a member of the evil Chaos army, and also appears in the next game, Dissidia NT with an alternate appearance featuring her green hair from Final Fantasy VI. Her character appears in the mobile title Dissidia Final Fantasy Opera Omnia.

Terra is a playable character in Theatrhythm Final Fantasy, Final Fantasy Explorers, Final Fantasy Airborne Brigade, and World of Final Fantasy, where she is voiced by Yukari Fukui. She is also one of the randomly purchasable "Premium" characters in Final Fantasy: All the Bravest and a collectible character in Record Keeper and Brave Exvius. Final Fantasy Tactics S briefly allowed Terra and other Final Fantasy characters to join their parties. Players can outfit their characters in Terras outfit in Gunslinger Stratos 2. Her character was included in the technical demo Final Fantasy VI: The Interactive CG Game. Merchandise items featuring the character such as gashapon figurines and full models have been produced.

Spin-off appearances typically portray Terra with blonde hair in line with Amano's original concept art, rather than the green hair seen in Shibuya'a in-game sprites.

Development 
Developers initially conceived of the character that would become Terra Branford as a half-esper young man in his early 20s. He was to be a partner and rival of the dark, mysterious Locke Cole. The character's design changed over time, however, to that of an eighteen-year-old half-esper female. Character designer Yoshitaka Amano initially created the concept art for Terra. Tetsuya Nomura, one of the game's graphic directors, redesigned her in chibi form for her representation in the game. The main difference between the two was her in-game appearance has green hair as opposed to her original blonde. In a 2006 interview, Amano said that Terra was his favorite video game character to design. The developers intended for the game to have an ensemble cast with no unique protagonist. For this reason, the second half of the game opens with another character, Celes Chere, instead of Terra, who opened the first. Another reason for this shift is that the team wanted Terra's story arc to progress in a new direction after the first half. The game story made Terra a very passive character in the first half of the game to show her personal growth and strength as the story progressed. At the end of the game, Terra was initially going to die when magic left the world, but the development team decided that this would be "excessive" as she had finally discovered her humanity and let her live without her magic powers.

Although the character's name is "Tina Branford" in Japanese media, American playtesters "hated the name Tina, almost to a person!", according to the game's translator Ted Woolsey. For this reason, Woolsey renamed the character "Terra" in the North American English version of the game. While acknowledging that some might dislike the name change, he noted that the games he worked on "were meant for a broader audience than the one which buys and plays Japanese imports", and those who know Japanese should play the original versions. In the game Dissidia Final Fantasy, Nomura chose Terra as the representative hero for Final Fantasy VI. He reasoned that without her, there would be no female hero character in the game's roster. Nomura stated that "based on [his] feelings" from Final Fantasy VIs production, he "thought it had to be Terra" as she appeared on the game's cover art and advertisements. Gameplay-wise, Terra is Nomura's favorite character in Dissidia Final Fantasy.

Reception 

The character was very well received, especially among the Japanese fans of Final Fantasy. Though she does not form a couple with anyone in Final Fantasy VI, "Terra and Edgar" and "Terra and Locke" were popular fan wishes in polls of Japanese fans. That same year, she was ranked sixth in V Jumps poll for the most popular characters in the Final Fantasy series. A 2013 poll by Square Enix saw that Terra was the sixth most popular Final Fantasy female character in Japan. In an article about Dissidia Final Fantasy, IGN editor Ryan Clements called her one of the most recognizable and well-loved characters to fight against evil alongside other Final Fantasy protagonists.

In 1996, Next Generation chose the scene of Terra learning to love again by taking care of orphaned children as the most memorable moment in the Final Fantasy series: "It's safe to say that no other game series has tackled such big issues, or reached such a level of emotional complexity. It truly is beautiful". In 2013, Gus Turner of Complex ranked Terra as the fifth most significant Final Fantasy character of all time, calling her "a benchmark for all female protagonists in the series, made unique by the multi-dimensional aspects of her personality and backstory", and stating "what characters like Yuna and Aeris continued, Terra started". Also that year, Michael Rougeau, also of Complex, ranked her as the ninth most celebrated female lead character in video game history, calling her "one of the most compelling and complex heroines in gaming" and declaring her a much better female Final Fantasy protagonist than Final Fantasy XIIIs  Lightning. That same year, Tom's Guide's Marshall Honorof included her among the top ten female protagonists in video game history. Entertainment Weeklys Darren Franich listed her as one of "15 Kick-Ass Women in Videogames", asserting that "going through a Django-like transformation from brain-washed slave to active hero, she's far more interesting than the simple Madonna-whore dichotomy of Final Fantasy VIIs Aeris and Tifa". The book Japanese Culture Through Videogames addresses Terra as a complex fictional character, comparing her with Metal Gears Solid Snake, Final Fantasy VIIs Cloud Strife and Tekkens Jin Kazama due to her identity issues.

See also
 Characters of Final Fantasy VI
 Women warriors in literature and culture

References 
Notes

References

Characters designed by Tetsuya Nomura
Female characters in video games
Fictional characters with evocation or summoning abilities
Fictional characters with amnesia
Fictional child soldiers
Fictional half-elves
Fictional mass murderers
Fictional revolutionaries
Fictional slaves in video games
Fictional spiritual mediums
Fictional super soldiers
Fictional characters with post-traumatic stress disorder
Fictional swordfighters in video games
Fictional vehicle operators
Fictional witches
Final Fantasy characters
Final Fantasy VI
Orphan characters in video games
Shapeshifter characters in video games
Square Enix protagonists
Teenage characters in video games
Video game characters introduced in 1994
Video game characters who use magic
Woman soldier and warrior characters in video games